Thomas Charles Howard (19 July 1781 – 18 May 1864) was an English professional cricketer who played first-class cricket from 1803 to 1828.  He was mainly associated with Hampshire sides but also played for Marylebone Cricket Club (MCC), where he was employed as a ground staff bowler.

Howard was a right-handed batsman and an occasional wicketkeeper but he was noted as a right arm fast medium bowler, using the underarm style.  He made 88 known appearances in first-class cricket and is one of a handful of players who appeared for both teams in the Gentlemen v Players series.

Howard played for the Players in the inaugural and second Gentlemen v Players matches in 1806 and made further appearances for the Players to 1829.  He also played for the Gentlemen as a given man in 1820, when his involvement in nine dismissals was a factor in their 70 run victory.

References

1781 births
1864 deaths
English cricketers
English cricketers of 1787 to 1825
English cricketers of 1826 to 1863
Hampshire cricketers
Players cricketers
Marylebone Cricket Club cricketers
Left-Handed v Right-Handed cricketers
Gentlemen cricketers
Non-international England cricketers
Epsom cricketers
Godalming Cricket Club cricketers
E. H. Budd's XI cricketers
Old Wykehamists cricketers
People from Hartley Wintney
William Ward's XI cricketers
George Osbaldeston's XI cricketers